In enzymology, an alcohol O-acetyltransferase is an enzyme that catalyzes the chemical reaction

acetyl-CoA + an alcohol  CoA + an acetyl ester

Thus, the two substrates of this enzyme are acetyl-CoA and alcohol, whereas its two products are CoA and an acetyl ester.

This enzyme belongs to the family of transferases, specifically those acyltransferases transferring groups other than aminoacyl groups.  The systematic name of this enzyme class is acetyl-CoA:alcohol O-acetyltransferase. This enzyme is also called alcohol acetyltransferase.

References

 

EC 2.3.1
Enzymes of unknown structure